Bury Football Club is an English association football club based in the town of Bury, which was in Lancashire until 1974 when it was absorbed into Greater Manchester. Founded in 1885, Bury first entered the FA Cup in 1887–88. Drawn to play Blackburn Rovers away from home, they travelled to Ewood Park but scratched before the game; the two teams played a friendly match instead, which Bury lost heavily. The team first contested an FA Cup match in 1891–92: they beat Witton and Heywood Central before losing to Blackpool after a replay in the third qualifying round.

Bury were founder members of and runners-up in the Lancashire League in 1889–90, and won the championship in their second and third seasons. They were elected to the Football League ahead of the 1893–94 season, won the Second Division title that same season by a nine-point margin, and beat Liverpool, the First Division's bottom club, in the test match to gain promotion. They retained their top-flight status for 17 seasons. During that period Bury twice won the FA Cup. In the 1900 final, they beat Southern League team Southampton by four goals to nil. Three years later, they did not concede a goal in any round as they went on to beat Derby County 6–0, which remains the widest winning margin in an FA Cup final; the ball used in that match is on display at the National Football Museum.

They returned to the First Division for a five-season spell in the mid-1920s, and achieved their highest ever finish, of fourth place, in 1925–26. Relegated back to the Second in 1929, Bury did not play in the top flight again; the closest they came was a third place in 1936–37. They flirted with relegation all through the 1950s, finally dropping into the Third Division North for the first time in the club's history in that league's last season before the regional sections were amalgamated into national Third and Fourth Divisions in 1958. Returning to the Second Division as Third Division champions in 1961, Bury spent seven of the next eight seasons at that level. In 1962–63, they reached the semi-final of the Football League Cup, losing 4–3 on aggregate to eventual winners Birmingham City. By 1971 Bury were in the Fourth Division, only for a three-season spell, but they were to spend the first half of the 1980s at that level.

Further spells in the third and fourth tiers preceded two successive promotions in the mid-1990s: third place in Division Threeafter the Premier League broke away from the Football League in 1992, the divisions were renumbered upwardsfollowed by the Division Two title in 1996–97 brought Bury to the second tier for the first time in forty years. After two seasons they were relegated, and by 2002, financial problems brought the club into administration and to the brink of folding. A supporters' campaign raised enough money to keep the club afloat, and in recognition of his role within that process, UEFA presented club press officer Gordon Sorfleet with their Best Supporter award for 2002. Bury were relegated at the end of that season, and then yo-yoed between the third and fourth tiers. Promoted to League One in 2019 against a background of increasingly damaging financial and ownership issues, Bury's early fixtures in the 2019–20 season were successively postponed until, on 27 August 2019, after 125 years continuous membership, the club was expelled from the Football League.

Bury spent 22 seasons in the top tier of the English football league system, 39 in the second, 29 in the third and 24 in the fourth. The table details the team's achievements and the top goalscorer in senior first-team competitions from their first season in the FA Cup in 1887–88.

Key

Key to league record:
P – Played
W – Games won
D – Games drawn
L – Games lost
F – Goals for
A – Goals against
Pts – Points
Pos – Final position

Key to divisions:
Lancs – Lancashire League
Div 1 – Football League First Division
Div 2 – Football League Second Division
Div 3 – Football League Third Division
Div 4 – Football League Fourth Division
League 1 – Football League One, EFL League One
League 2 – Football League Two, EFL League Two

Key to rounds:
Group – Group stage
Prelim – Preliminary round
QR3 – Third qualifying round
QR4 – Fourth qualifying round
R1 – First round
R2 – Second round, etc.
QF – Quarter-final
SF – Semi-final
F – Final
W – Winners
(N) – Northern section of regionalised stage
DNE – Did not enter
Scr – Scratched
DQ – Disqualified
Exp – Expelled

Details of the abandoned 1939–40 Football League season are shown in italics and appropriately footnoted.

Seasons

Notes

References
General
 
Specific

External links
Bury F.C. official website

Seasons
 
English football club seasons
Seasons